Aliou Siby Badra is an Ivorian former professional footballer who played as a midfielder for ASEC Mimosas, Club Africain,  and Al-Hilal FC.

External links
 

1971 births
Living people
Association football midfielders
Ivorian footballers
Ivorian expatriate footballers
ASEC Mimosas players
Club Africain players
Al Hilal SFC players
Saudi Professional League players
Expatriate footballers in Tunisia
Expatriate footballers in Saudi Arabia
2000 African Cup of Nations players
Place of birth missing (living people)
Ivory Coast international footballers